This is a list of notable Old Mahindians, they being the alumni of Mahinda College, Galle, Sri Lanka.

Politics

Education

Religion

Military

Sports

Arts

Others

References

 
Mahinda College